Elena Gennadyevna Prokofyeva (Russian: Елена Геннадьевна Прокофьева, born 2 August 1994) is a Russian synchronized swimmer.

She has won 6 gold medals at World Aquatics Championships, 3 in 2013 and 3 in 2015. She also won a gold medal at the 2014 European Aquatics Championships, as well as 2 gold medals at the 2013 Summer Universiade.

References
Profile at the 2013 Summer Universiade

Living people
Russian synchronized swimmers
1994 births
World Aquatics Championships medalists in synchronised swimming
Swimmers from Moscow
Synchronized swimmers at the 2015 World Aquatics Championships
Synchronized swimmers at the 2013 World Aquatics Championships
Synchronized swimmers at the 2016 Summer Olympics
Olympic synchronized swimmers of Russia
Olympic gold medalists for Russia
Olympic medalists in synchronized swimming
Medalists at the 2016 Summer Olympics
Universiade medalists in synchronized swimming
Universiade gold medalists for Russia
European Aquatics Championships medalists in synchronised swimming
Medalists at the 2013 Summer Universiade